The Ascot–Ash Vale line is a railway line in South East England running from Ascot to Ash Vale.

Infrastructure 

The rest of the route is double-tracked.

The line is electrified using 750 V DC third rail.

Services 

Passenger services on the line used to run from Ascot to Guildford continuing via the Alton line and the North Downs Line. Ascot station is located on the line from London Waterloo to Reading, just to the south of the famous racecourse. From here, services travel a short distance west along the Waterloo to Reading Line to Ascot Junction. Here they turn south and travel to Ash Vale Jn, joining a section of the Alton Line as far as Aldershot. Services then retrace its route back along the Alton Line before joining the North Downs Line via a chord between Aldershot North Jn to Aldershot South Jn for the remainder of the journey to Guildford.

Until 2017, pairs of Class 456, transferred from Southern, used to operate the shuttles between Ascot and Guildford (turning around at Aldershot). The trains have since been replaced by Class 450s.

The Monday to Saturday service prior to May 2019 was:

 2 trains an hour between Guildford and Ascot stations during the day, in the evening 1 train per hour.
 The first trains towards Ascot start from, and the last trains terminate at, Farnham railway station or Aldershot railway station.
 Some trains during the Morning and Evening peaks, Monday to Friday, travel to/from London Waterloo station joining the Waterloo–Reading line at Ascot station.

On Sundays an hourly service ran.

Current service 

Passenger services are operated by  South Western Railway. The service is currently 2 trains per hour between Aldershot and Ascot through most of the day. There are several trains to and from London Waterloo at weekday peak times. After the direct Ascot–Guildford service has been split, services from Guildford continue to Farnham which was required under the franchise agreement. The current timetables due to be implemented in December 2018, however due to the May 2018 timetable problems the changes were delayed.

References

Railway lines in South East England
Rail transport in Berkshire
Rail transport in Surrey
Standard gauge railways in England